Nepenthes hirtella is a tropical pitcher plant endemic to Krabi province in Thailand. Nepenthes hirtella differs from the closely allied Nepenthes kerrii from Tarutao Marine Park, Satun Province in Thailand, by its oblanceolate leaves (obovate in N. kerrii), tendril characters, longer lower pitchers, ovate lid, filiform spur, flowers that are solitary or rarely two-flowered that are borne on partial peduncle, and indumentumn that covers all the vegetative parts.

References

Carnivorous plants of Asia
hirtella
Plants described in 2022